Radio Cook Islands (630 AM) is a private national Cook Islands radio station. Headquartered in Avarua, the station broadcasts throughout the country, including Rarotonga, the Northern Cook Islands, and the Southern Cook Islands. 80% of its programming is broadcast in Cook Islands Māori, with the remaining 20% in English.

Radio Cook Islands was established in the 1970s by the Government of the Cook Islands. The station was privatized in 1996, but reverted to government control in December 1998. In March 1999, Elijah Communications, a subsidiary of the Pitt Media Group, acquired the station from the government. Elijah Communications introduced new programming, as well as reformed the station's finances, by 2000. 

In 2019, the Cook Islands government asked the station to reactivate its backup AM transmitter over concerns that some parts of the country might lack a radio signal during cyclone season.

The late broadcaster Tony Hakaoro hosted the popular afternoon talk show, "Karangaranga," on the station.

References

External links
Radio Cook Islands history
"Radio Cook Islands - The Voice of the Nation" official Facebook

Radio stations in the Cook Islands
Mass media in the Cook Islands